Thomas Lilbourne Anderson (December 8, 1808 – March 6, 1885) was a slave owner and practicing lawyer who served in the United States House of Representatives from Missouri for two terms from 1857 to 1861.

Biography 
He was born in Bowling Green, Kentucky, and was admitted to the Kentucky bar in 1828.  He began the practice of law in Franklin, Kentucky, later moving to Palmyra, Missouri, in 1830.

Political career 
He was elected to the Missouri House of Representatives in 1840, and remained a member of that body through 1844.  He also served as a member of the Missouri Constitutional Convention of 1845.

On December 24, 1853, he condemned mass escapes of enslaved people due to their high cost to slave owners.

Congress 
He was first elected to the United States Congress in 1857 as a member of the American Party (Know-Nothing), winning reelection in 1859 as an Independent Democrat.  He also served as a presidential elector for the Whig Party in 1844, 1848, 1852, and 1856.

Death and burial 
He died in Palmyra in 1885 and was interred in the City Cemetery.

References

Who Was Who in America, Historical Volume 1607-1896. Chicago: Marquis Who's Who, 1967.

1808 births
1885 deaths
Politicians from Bowling Green, Kentucky
Missouri Whigs
Know-Nothing members of the United States House of Representatives from Missouri
Independent Democrat members of the United States House of Representatives from Missouri
Members of the Missouri House of Representatives
Kentucky lawyers
American slave owners
People from Marion County, Missouri
19th-century American lawyers
People of Missouri in the American Civil War